Vance and Netty Palmer may refer to:
Vance Palmer (1885–1959), Australian novelist, dramatist, essayist and critic
Nettie Palmer (1885–1964), Australian poet, essayist and Australia's leading literary critic of her day; wife of Vance Palmer